Campeonato da 2ª Divisão do Futebol, is the second division of the Macau Football Association, created in 2005. As with the Hong Kong First Division League, it is separate from the mainland Chinese football league system, including the Chinese Super League and leagues above and below it. The winners are promoted to the Liga de Elite and the last place team is relegated to Campeonato da 3ª Divisão do Futebol.

2017 Teams
Below are the following 10 teams that will be competing in the 2017 2ª Divisão de Macau
Chong Wa
Casa de Portugal
Ieong Heng
Tim Iec
Alfândega
Hang Sai
Consulado (CDF Benfica)
Hong Lok
TKKL
Chuac Lun

Previous Winners

2005: Hoi Fan
2006: League Inactive
2007: Cycle de Macau
2008: Windsor Arch Ka I
2009: FC Porto de Macau
2010: Hong Ngai

2011: Kuan Tai
2012: Chao Pak Kei
2013: Sporting Clube de Macau
2014: Casa de Portugal em Macau
2015: Lo Leong
2016: MFA Development
2017: Hang Sai
2018: Tim Iec

References

2
Macau
2005 establishments in Macau
Sports leagues established in 2005